Ecclesfield United F.C. was an English association football club based in Ecclesfield, South Yorkshire.

History
Little is known of the club other than that it competed in the FA Cup in the 1927–28 season.

League and cup history

Records
Best FA Cup performance: 1st Qualifying Round, 1927–28

References

Defunct football clubs in England
Defunct football clubs in South Yorkshire
Sheffield Association League
Sheffield Amateur League